The Penn State Nittany Lions women represented Penn State University in CHA women's ice hockey during the 2015-16 NCAA Division I women's ice hockey season. For the second consecutive year, the Nittany Lions finished conference play in third place, and advanced to the CHA Tournament Semi-Final, before losing to Syracuse.  Penn State took that game into triple overtime, before falling 3-2.

Standings

Offseason
August 3: Goaltender Celine Whitlinger was selected to attend the 2015 USA Hockey Women’s National Festival.

Recruiting

Roster

2015–16 Nittany Lions

Schedule

|-
!colspan=12 style=""| Regular Season

|-
!colspan=12 style=""| CHA Tournament

Awards and honors

Micayla Catanzariti, CHA Defensive Forward of the Year

Jill Holdcroft, CHA Sportsmanship Award

Celine Whitlinger G, All-CHA Second Team
Amy Peterson F, All-CHA Second Team

References

Penn State
Penn State women's ice hockey seasons